War of Darkness is an adventure for fantasy role-playing games published by Mayfair Games in 1986.

Contents
War of Darkness is a scenario for characters levels 12-14 set during an invasion by an army of evil creatures.  The heroes are sent on a mission to retake a small fortress, unaware that a great evil has moved into the caverns beneath it.

Publication history
War of Darkness was written by Mark Perry, with a cover by Frank Frazetta, and was published by Mayfair Games in 1986 as a 32-page book and a removable cardstock map sheet.

Reception

Reviews

References

Fantasy role-playing game adventures
Role Aids
Role-playing game supplements introduced in 1986